Berrefjord is a Norwegian surname. Berefjord written also Berrefjord is a fjord in Norway. Notable people with the surname include:

Pål Berrefjord (born 1977), Norwegian politician
Oddvar Berrefjord (1918–1999), Norwegian jurist and politician

Norwegian-language surnames